A simple lipid is a fatty acid ester of different alcohols and carries no other substance. These lipids belong to a heterogeneous class of predominantly nonpolar compounds, mostly insoluble in water, but soluble in nonpolar organic solvents such as chloroform and benzene.

Simple lipids: esters of fatty acids with various alcohols.
a. Fats: esters of fatty acids with glycerol. Oils are fats in the liquid state. Fats are also called triglycerides because all the three hydroxyl groups of glycerol are esterified.
b. Waxes: Solid esters of long-chain fatty acids such as palmitic acid with aliphatic or alicyclic higher molecular weight monohydric alcohols. Waxes are water-insoluble due to the weakly polar nature of the ester group.

See also
 Lipid

Lipids